This article details the Salford Red Devils rugby league football club's 2016 season. This is the Red Devils 8th consecutive season in the Super League and their 3rd season using the Red Devils name.

2016 fixtures and results

2016 Super League Fixtures

2016 Super 8 Qualifiers

Player appearances
Super League Only

 = Injured

 = Suspended

Challenge Cup

Player appearances
Challenge Cup Games only

2016 squad statistics

 Appearances and points include (Super League, Challenge Cup and Play-offs) as of 28 March 2016.

 = Injured
 = Suspended

2016 transfers in/out

In

Out

References

External links
Salford Red Devils Website
Salford Red Devils – SL Website

Salford Red Devils seasons
Super League XXI by club